Investment Securities are securities that have been purchased as an investment.  This is in contrast to securities that are purchased by a broker-dealer or other financial intermediary for resale or short term speculation.

Under United States law Investment Securities have a specific meaning and are governed by article 8 of the Uniform Commercial Code (UCC).

United States law
Investment Securities is a legal concept enshrined into Article 8 of the UCC. The ownership aspects concerning securities are governed in the United States by Article 8 of the UCC. 

This Article 8, actually a text of about thirty pages, has undergone an important recasting in 1994. Since 1994, Article 8 of the UCC considers that the majority of the dematerialized securities that are registered on an account with intermediaries are only reflections of their respective initial issue registered by the two American central securities depositories, respectively the Depository Trust Company (DTC) for the securities issued by corporates and the Federal reserve for the securities issued by the Treasury Department . In this centralized system, the title transfer of the securities does not take place at the time of the registration on the account of the investor, but within the systems managed by the DTC and/or by the Federal reserve.  This centralization would not be shocking if it were also accompanied by a centralized register of the investors/owners of the securities, like what is done today in Sweden and in Finland(so-called "transparent systems"). But the DTC and the FED hold no individual register of the transfers of property, so that the possibility for an investor of proving the property of its securities relies entirely on the good replication of the transfer recorded by the DTC and FED at the lower tiers of the holding chain of the securities.

Each one of these links is composed respectively of an account provider (or intermediary) and of an account holder the latter being itself, except for the final investor, account provider of another account holder located at the lower link. The rights created through these links, are purely contractual claims: these rights are of two kinds: 

- for the links where the account holder is itself an account provider at a lower tier, the right on the security during the time where it is credited there is characterized as a "securities entitlement", which is an "ad hoc" concept invented in 1994: i.e. designating a claim that will enable the account holder to take part to a prorate distribution in the event of bankruptcy of its account provider. 

- For the last link of the chain, in which the account holder is at the same time the final investor, its "security entitlement" is enriched by the "substantial" rights defined by the issuer : right to receive dividends or interests and, possibly, right to take part in the general meetings, when that was laid down in the account agreement concluded with the account provider. The combination of these reduced material rights and of these variable substantial rights is characterized by article 8 of the UCC as a "beneficial interest".

This decomposition of the rights organized by Article 8 of the UCC results in preventing the investor to revindicate the security in case of bankruptcy of the account provider, that is to say the possibility to claim the security as its own asset, without being obliged to share it at its prorate value with the other creditors of the account provider. As a consequence, it also prevents the investor, to assert its securities at the upper level of the holding chain, either up to the DTC or up to a sub-custodian. Such a "security entitlement", unlike a normal ownership right, is no longer enforceable "erga omnes" to any person supposed to have the security in its custody. The "security entitlement" is a mere relative right, therefore a contractual right. Furthermore, this re-characterization of the proprietary right into a simple contractual right enables the account provider, to "re-use" the security without necessarily being obliged to ask for the authorization of the investor, in particular within the framework of temporary operations such as security lending, option to repurchase, buy to sell back or repurchase agreement. Last, but not least, it stumps the distinction between the downward holding chain which traces the way in which the security was subscribed by the investor and the horizontal and/or ascending chains which trace the way in which the security has been transferred or sub-deposited.

Contrarily to some claims suggesting that Article 8 of the UCC denies the substantial rights of American investors when they hold securities through intermediaries such as banks, Article 8 has helped US negotiators during the negotiations of the Geneva Securities Convention, also known as the Unidroit convention on substantive rules for intermediated securities.

References

Investment
Securities (finance)